Eucalyptus oraria, commonly known as ooragmandee, is a species of mallee  that is endemic to coastal and near-coastal areas of Western Australia. It has smooth greyish bark, sometimes with rough, flaky bark on the base of the trunk, lance-shaped adult leaves, flower buds in groups of nine or more, white flowers and barrel-shaped fruit.

Description
It has smooth, greyish bark that is shed in strips, sometimes with rough, flaky bark on the base of the trunk. Flowering mainly occurs from August to October and the flowers are white. The fruit is a woody, barrel-shaped capsule with the valves below the level of the rim.

Taxonomy and naming
Eucalyptus oraria was first formally described in 1962 by Lawrie Johnson from specimens he collected near Dongara in 1960. The specific epithet (oraria) is from the Latin orarius meaning "pertaining to the coast".

Distribution and habitat
Ooragmandee grows in sand in coastal and near-coastal areas, often over limestone and is found from near Jurien Bay to near Kalbarri and on some nearby offshore islands.

See also
List of Eucalyptus species

References

Eucalypts of Western Australia
oraria
Myrtales of Australia
Mallees (habit)
Plants described in 1962
Taxa named by Lawrence Alexander Sidney Johnson